Cao Ngọc Phương Trinh (born 4 August 1972) is a Vietnamese judoka, who is known for being the champion for three consecutive SEA Games (16, 17 and 18). She competed in the women's extra-lightweight event at the 1996 Summer Olympics.

In 2021, Trinh was working as a physical education teacher and Judo coach at Minh Khai Club (Nguyen Thi Minh Khai High School).

References

External links
 

1972 births
Living people
Vietnamese female judoka
Olympic judoka of Vietnam
Judoka at the 1996 Summer Olympics
Place of birth missing (living people)
21st-century Vietnamese women